Stadionul Silviu Ploeșteanu, previously known as Stadionul Tineretului,  is a multi-purpose stadium in Brașov, Romania. It is currently used mostly for football matches and is the home ground of SR Brașov and Corona Brașov. The arena was named after Silviu Ploeșteanu (1913–1969) on April 13, 2002, who managed the club between 1948 and 1968.

The central section of the stadium's North stand is the second oldest in Romanian football, its lateral sections being completed in 1980. The South stand was built in 1956, and the East and West stands were inaugurated in the 1969–1970 season. The East stand was eventually demolished in the summer of 2008.

See also

List of football stadiums in Romania

External links
 The stadium on the club's official website

Gallery

Football venues in Romania
Stadionul Silviu Ploesteanu
Multi-purpose stadiums in Romania